Fábio Alexandre Barbosa Santos (born 14 November 1992 in Penafiel) is a Portuguese footballer who plays as a goalkeeper. He is the nephew of former professional goalkeeper Nuno Santos.

Football career
On 21 October 2012, Santos made his professional debut with Académica de Coimbra in a 2012–13 Taça de Portugal match against A.D. Ponte da Barca.

References

External links

Stats and profile at LPFP 

1992 births
Living people
People from Penafiel
Portuguese footballers
Association football goalkeepers
Associação Académica de Coimbra – O.A.F. players
G.D. Tourizense players
Sertanense F.C. players
F.C. Felgueiras 1932 players
AD Oliveirense players
A.D. Sanjoanense players
S.C. Coimbrões players
Gondomar S.C. players
Campeonato de Portugal (league) players
Sportspeople from Porto District